Dragan Ivanov (born 16 November 1972) is a retired Macedonian football midfielder.

References

1972 births
Living people
Macedonian footballers
FK Makedonija Gjorče Petrov players
FK Sileks players
FK Rabotnički players
NK Zadar players
FK Bregalnica Štip players
Association football midfielders
Macedonian expatriate footballers
Expatriate footballers in Croatia
Macedonian expatriate sportspeople in Croatia